Kim Myeong-shin (Hangul: 김명신; born November 29, 1993) is South Korean professional baseball pitcher who is currently playing for the Doosan Bears of KBO League. He graduated from Kyungsung University (Hangul: 경성대학교, Hanja: 慶星大學校) and was selected to Doosan Bears by a draft in 2017.(2nd draft, 2nd round)

Career Records

References

External links 

 Career statistics and player information from Korea Baseball Organization
 Kim Myung-shin at Doosan Bears Baseball Club

Living people
KBO League pitchers
KBO League players
Doosan Bears players
1993 births
People from Daegu
Sportspeople from Daegu